Events in the year 1898 in India

Incumbents
 Empress of India – Queen Victoria
 Viceroy of India – Victor Bruce, 9th Earl of Elgin

Events
 National income - 6,227 million
 Frontier War of 1897–98

Law
Code Of Criminal Procedure
 Indian Post Office Act
Live-stock Importation Act

Births
19 January – Vishnu Sakharam Khandekar, writer (died 1976).
21 November – Shri Rang Avadhoot, Saint who is regarded as an incarnation of Lord Dattatreya, (died 1968 in India)
25 November – Debaki Bose, film director, writer and actor (died 1971).
2 December – Indra Lal Roy, World War I flying ace, killed in action (died 1918).

Deaths
1 October – Manilal Dwivedi (b. 1858), regarded as one of the most influential Gujarati writer and thinker, died at premature age, 40.
 March 27, SA(Syed Ahmed)Khan (Islamist scholar, Founder of Two Nations Theory), Aligarh.
June 27, Dwarkanath Ganguly , a great social reformer and husband of Kadambini Ganguly died. According to the sources, he was suffering from Hepatitis.

References

 
India
Years of the 19th century in India